Computational and Systems Neuroscience (COSYNE or CoSyNe) is an annual scientific conference for the exchange of experimental and theoretical/computational approaches to problems in systems neuroscience. It is an important meeting for computational neuroscientists where many levels of approaches are discussed. It is a single track-meeting with oral and poster sessions and attracts about 800-900 participants from a variety of disciplines, including neuroscience, computer science and machine learning. Until 2018, the 3-day long main meeting was held in Salt Lake City, followed by two days of workshops at Snowbird, Utah. In 2018, COSYNE moved to Denver (3 days) and Breckenridge (2 days).

History 
COSYNE grew out of the Neural Information and Coding (NIC) meetings founded by Anthony Zador in 1996. The first COSYNE was organized in 2004 by Michael Shadlen, Alexandre Pouget, Carlos Brody and Anthony Zador. The current Executive Committee consists of Alexandre Pouget, Zachary Mainen, Stephanie Palmer and Anthony Zador.

Meetings

Related Meetings 
 Neural Information Processing Systems (since 1987)
 Annual meeting of the Organization for Computational Neuroscience (since 1990/1992)
 Conference on Cognitive Computational Neuroscience (since 2017)
 Berstein Conference (since 2005)

References 

Neuroscience conferences
International conferences in the United States
Events in Salt Lake City